Creature from the Black Lagoon is a pinball machine designed by John Trudeau ("Dr. Flash") and released by Midway (under the Bally brand name). It is loosely based on the movie of the same name. The game's theme is 1950s drive-in theater. The pinball game was licensed from Universal Studios by Bally so that all backglass and cabinet artwork and creature depictions would resemble those of the original movie.

Hologram
The centerpiece of the table's playfield is a holographic depiction of the titular Creature, illuminated and in motion during  multiball play within its "Black Lagoon habitat" (the space beneath the playfield visible through a customized window). The green hologram was produced by Polaroid and is affixed to a metal plate that is divided into three sections which are designed so that the hologram appears to float. A cam behind one section presses against the back of the plate, gently bending the hologram's surface, so that the Creature appears to "ripple" as if underwater and to swipe at the player with its claw. A second motor mounted in the bottom of the cabinet oscillates the light-reflecting mirror, changing the direction of the light source and causing the image of the creature to slowly turn from side to side.

Gameplay
The main objective of the game is to collect the four letters in F-I-L-M and enable multiball play. Each letter is earned by completing a different objective; the Snack Bar can also give letters as random awards.

F: Shoot the ball into the left K-I-S-S scoop four times. At the start of a ball, the letter can be immediately earned with a properly timed skill shot that loops around the back of the field and comes down the left side.

I: Light the four menu targets to open the Snack Bar. Menu targets can also be lit by shooting into the Snack Bar.

L: Complete the P-A-I-D rollovers at the top right of the playfield. One rollover flashes at the start of each ball; hitting it immediately completes all four.

M: Shoot the ball into the Slide (right scoop).

Once all four letters have been earned, the player can shoot the ball into the left or right scoop to begin a two-ball multiball. The Creature will randomly hide the girl in one of three locations: the left scoop, the Snack Bar, or the right scoop. The player must make the correct shot to find the Creature, then hit the Snack Bar to rescue the girl, and finally hit the Snack Bar again to collect the Jackpot. The jet bumpers must then be hit a specified number of times to light the Super Jackpot, which is worth double the current Jackpot and can be collected by shooting the Snack Bar one more time. The entire cycle then starts again, with the Jackpot value doubled; however, the doubling stops once the base Jackpot value reaches or exceeds 500 million.

The Jackpot is set to 40 million at the start of the game and can be increased by hitting the jet bumpers. During multiball, shots to the left ramp feed into a small whirlpool above the right flipper, adding letters to the word CREATURE for every revolution; once the word is completed, the playfield multiplier is increased by one, to a maximum of four. This multiplier affects all shot values, including Jackpots and Super Jackpots, and reverts to one after multiball ends.

If one ball drains without a Jackpot being scored, the player is given 12 seconds to shoot the Snack Bar and restart multiball.

Additional scoring modes or methods include:

Snack Bar: When the Snack Bar is open, shooting into this scoop gives a random award.

Mega Menu: The four menu targets are lit, awarding 5, 10, 15, and 20 million. This mode lasts for 20 seconds or until all targets are hit.

Playground Award: The game activates one of the following three modes at random.
 Unlimited Millions: The left ramp awards points for 24 seconds, starting at 3 million and increasing by this amount per shot.
 Fighter Jets: Jet bumpers award 1 million per hit for 25 seconds.
 Intermission Time: Both ramps award 5 million per shot for 15 seconds. 

Big Millions: The right ramp awards points for 10 seconds, starting at 5 million and increasing by this amount per shot.

Move Your Car: After a certain number of center shots, Move Your Car is activated. A score on the display starts at 8 million and decreases rapidly until reaching 2 million. Shooting a center shot scores the current score on the display and starts a 15 second timer. Successive center shots score 2x, 3x, and 4x the score of the first center shot. Each shot is accompanied by a graphic of an irate patron deploying various weaponry (dynamite, rocket launcher, flamethrower, nuclear bomb) against a van that has blocked his view of the movie screen.

Double Feature Combo: Shoot the left ramp several times in succession. The first shot sets the combo value at 500,000, and each successive shot doubles it to a maximum of 16 million. The value is collected by hitting the center shot.

Snack Attack: After shooting the right ramp four times, a hurry-up value begins to count down from 20 million. Shooting the Snack Bar awards the remaining points.

Video Mode: After shooting the right ramp eight times, one scoop lights up to begin Video Mode, changed by hitting the slingshots. In this mode, a peeping Tom appears, and the player must hit the flipper buttons to punch him as he dodges back and forth. 

Super Scoring: After shooting the right ramp 12 times, a 12 second timer starts. Shoot the Snack Bar scoop to begin Super Scoring, which activates Mega Menu, Big Millions, Snack Attack, Unlimited Millions, and Intermission Time scoring modes all at once. This mode lasts for 25 seconds.

Super Creature Feature: During Super Scoring, shoot the ball into the left ramp within the first 10 seconds to divert it into the whirlpool. The first spin is worth 5 million, and the value increases by this amount per spin to a maximum of 35 million.

Songs
There were five 1950s songs put in the game. These are:
 "Rock Around the Clock" by Bill Haley and the Comets
 "Get a Job" by The Silhouettes
 "Summertime Blues" by Eddie Cochran
 "Willie and the Hand Jive" by Johnny Otis
 "Red River Rock" (Johnny and the Hurricanes version)

All of the songs are synthesizer-based instrumental versions played by the game's sound hardware.

Digital versions
Until 2018 the Creature from the Black Lagoon was available as a licensed table of The Pinball Arcade for several platforms. Due to music licensing issues, however, "Summertime Blues" and "Get a Job" were not included. In addition, two Easter Eggs which refer to Mortal Kombat are disabled since the game's Family Mode is permanently activated in the Pinball Arcade incarnation. This table is also included in Williams Pinball Classics (2001) for PC.

References

External links

Internet Pinball Database entry for Creature from the Black Lagoon
Pinball Archive Rule Sheet: Creature from the Black Lagoon
Interview with the Creature from the Black Lagoon team, part 1 archived article at Wayback Machine
Interview with the Creature from the Black Lagoon team, part 2 archived article at Wayback Machine

Pinball machines based on films
Bally pinball machines
1992 pinball machines